The 2004–05 Georgian Cup (also known as the David Kipiani Cup) was the sixty-first season overall and fifteenth since independence of the Georgian annual football tournament. The competition began on 25 August 2004 and ended with the Final held on 26 May 2005. The defending champions are Dinamo Tbilisi.

Round of 32 
The first legs were played on 25 August and the second legs were played on 3 September 2004.

|}

Round of 16 
In this round entered winners from the previous round as well as three teams that finished at the top four in last year's Umaglesi Liga: WIT Georgia, Dinamo Tbilisi, FC Tbilisi and Dila Gori. The first legs were played on 20 October and the second legs were played on 3 November 2004.

|}

Quarterfinals 
The matches were played on 1 December (first legs) and 9 December 2004 (second legs).

|}

Semifinals 
The matches were played on 6 April (first legs) and 4 May 2005 (second legs).

|}

Final

See also 
 2004–05 Umaglesi Liga
 2004–05 Pirveli Liga

References

External links 
 The Rec.Sport.Soccer Statistics Foundation.
 es.geofootball.com  

Georgian Cup seasons
Cup
Georgian Cup, 2004-05